The Carruthers ministry was the 32nd ministry of the New South Wales Government, and was led by the 16th Premier, Joseph Carruthers. The title of Premier was widely used to refer to the Leader of Government, but was not a formal position in the government until 1920. Instead the Premier was appointed to another portfolio, usually Colonial Secretary. In this case, Carruthers chose the portfolio of Treasurer.

Carruthers was elected to the New South Wales Legislative Assembly at the 1887 election, serving until 1908. As the Commonwealth Parliament was forming, many leading figures sought federal seats. Carruthers became leader of the New South Wales opposition Liberal and Reform Association, the successor to the Free Trade Party, and led the Liberal-Reform alliance to government at the 1904 state election.

Under the constitution, ministers in the Legislative Assembly had their seats vacated on appointment and were required to regain them in an election. Such ministerial by-elections were usually uncontested and on this occasion by-elections were required in The Glebe (James Hogue) Bingara (Samuel Moore) and 
Tenterfield (Charles Lee) and all were comfortably re-elected. The other four ministers were re-elected unopposed. This was the final occasion in which ministers had to contest by-elections as the constitution was amended in 1906.

In 1907 the Progressive Party had negotiated a coalition agreement with the Liberal Reform Party however this was rejected by a vote of parliamentary members. The party leader Thomas Waddell resigned and joined the Liberal Reform Party, and a week later was appointed Chief Secretary in the ministry.

The ministry covers the period from 29 August 1904 until 1 October 1907, when Carruthers resigned in favour of Charles Wade in a new alliance between the Association and what remained of the Progressive Party.

Composition of ministry

Ministers were members of the Legislative Assembly unless otherwise noted.

See also

References

 

New South Wales ministries
1907 disestablishments
1904 establishments in Australia